Aubry is an unincorporated community in Johnson County, Kansas, United States, and part of the Kansas City metropolitan area.

History
Aubry Township laid out in 1858. A post office called Aubrey was established in 1860, and remained in operation until it was discontinued in 1888.

References

Further reading

External links
 Johnson County maps: Current, Historic, KDOT

Unincorporated communities in Johnson County, Kansas
Unincorporated communities in Kansas